Jay M. Apfelbaum (born 1951) of Pittsburgh, PA is an American bridge player. With a background as a lawyer and administrative law judge, he served three years as a member of the American Contract Bridge League (ACBL) Board of Directors and edited its appeals books.

He has been an accredited tournament director, including serving at the national level, for over 20 years. Apfelbaum won the Blue Ribbon Pairs in 1976 and holds the ACBL title of Emerald Life Master.

Bridge accomplishments

Wins

 North American Bridge Championships (1)
 Blue Ribbon Pairs (1) 1976

Runners-up
 
 North American Bridge Championships (1)
 Grand National Teams (1) 1993

Publications

Notes

American contract bridge players